Cloud Buster may refer to:

 Adcox Cloud Buster, a sport biplane built in Portland, Oregon in 1929
 Cloudbuster, an alleged method for preventing cloud build-ups and downpours
 Cloudbuster Ultralights Cloudbuster, an American ultralight aircraft designed and produced in the early 1980s